Duan Yingying was the defending champion, but chose not to participate.

Aryna Sabalenka won the title, defeating Nina Stojanović in the final, 5–7, 6–3, 6–1.

Seeds

Main draw

Finals

Top half

Bottom half

References 
 Main draw

Tianjin Health Industry Park - Singles
Tianjin Health Industry Park